Iarucanga is a genus of longhorn beetles of the subfamily Lamiinae, containing the following species:

 Iarucanga capillacea (Bates, 1866)
 Iarucanga mimica (Bates, 1866)

References

Hemilophini